Il partigiano Johnny, internationally released as Johnny the Partisan, is a 2000 Italian war drama film set in the Second World War and directed by Guido Chiesa. It is based on the novel of the same name by Beppe Fenoglio.

The film entered the competition at the 57th Venice International Film Festival, in which it won the Children and Cinema Award.

Plot
Johnny, a university student with a passion for English literature, deserts the Italian Army in Rome after the September 1943 Badoglio Proclamation, and returns home to Alba. He initially takes refuge in a villa in the hills, where he devotes himself to his studies. After the death of a friend, he decides to fight in the war again. He leaves the city and joins the first partisan formation he meets, the "Reds", led by Biondo. He doesn't share their communist ideology, only their desire to fight the Fascists.

Left alone after the group has dispersed under a German attack, he manages to reach a formation of the Badogliani, also called "Blues", or "Autonomous", led by the charismatic North Commander (Piero Balbo, nicknamed Nord). This group is in contact with the Anglo-American allies, who are better equipped and organized. Among them, he meets his dear friend Ettore, and together they participate in the temporary, symbolic occupation of Alba.

Multiple small clashes decimate and disperse their forces, and Ettore is captured and sentenced to death. Johnny finds himself facing the hard winter of 1944 alone again. In the spring, Nord gathers the men and resumes guerrilla activities. The film ends on a still shot of Johnny engaged in combat, perhaps overwhelmed by enemies, followed by the words "Two months after the war was over".

Cast and characters
 Stefano Dionisi as Johnny
 Fabrizio Gifuni as Ettore
 Andrea Prodan as Pierre
 Alberto Gimignani as Biondo
 Claudio Amendola as Nord
 Giuseppe Cederna as Nemega
 Umberto Orsini as Pinin
 Chiara Muti as Elda
 Lina Bernardi as Johnny's mother
 Toni Bertorelli as Johnny's father
 Felice Andreasi as miller
 Barbara Lerici as Sonia
 Flavio Bonacci as Pietro Chiodi
 Antonio Petrocelli as Leonardo Cocito
 Lucio Zagaria as Dario Scaglione
 Fabio De Luigi as Fascist deserter
 Giovanni Esposito as southern partisan
 Flavio Insinna as spy
 Sergio Trojano as Ivan
 Andrea Bruschi as Set

See also
 List of Italian films of 2000

References

External links
 

2000 films
2000s war films
Italian war films
2000s Italian-language films
Films about Italian resistance movement
Italian Campaign of World War II films
Films directed by Guido Chiesa
Italian World War II films
2000s Italian films
Fandango (Italian company) films